Mintz Peak is a small peak rising above the southeast corner of Mount Hartigan in the Executive Committee Range, Marie Byrd Land, Antarctica. It was mapped by the United States Geological Survey from surveys and U.S. Navy trimetrogon photography, 1958–60, and was named by the Advisory Committee on Antarctic Names for Jerome Mintz, a Meteorological Electronics Technician at Byrd Station in 1959. Mintz died in December 2010.

References

Mountains of Marie Byrd Land
Executive Committee Range